A recital is a concert, an instrumental or vocal music performance

Recital may also refer to:
 Recital (law), an account of the details of an act
 Organ recital
Recital, album by Mary O'Hara
Recital, album by Julius Patzak
Recital (Dave Burrell and Tyrone Brown album)
Recital (Nigel Kennedy album)
Recital, the Israeli brand-name of the antidepressant Citalopram